The 2028 Summer Paralympics, also known as the 18th Summer Paralympic Games, and commonly known as the LA28 Paralympic Games, are an upcoming international multi-sport parasports event governed by the International Paralympic Committee, scheduled to take place from August 15 to August 27, 2028, in Los Angeles, California, United States.

Marking Los Angeles' first time as the Paralympics host, the Games will be the first Summer Paralympics since the 1996 edition in Atlanta to take place in the United States, and the third overall.

Bids

As part of a formal agreement between the International Paralympic Committee and the International Olympic Committee first established in 2001, the winner of the bid for the 2028 Summer Olympics must also host the 2028 Summer Paralympics.

Due to concerns over a number of cities withdrawing in the bid process of the 2022 Winter Olympics and 2024 Summer Olympics, a process to award the 2024 and 2028 Games simultaneously to the final two cities in the running to the 2024 Summer Olympics—Los Angeles and Paris—was approved at an Extraordinary IOC Session on July 11, 2017, in Lausanne. Paris was understood to be the preferred host for the 2024 Games. On July 31, 2017, the IOC announced Los Angeles as the sole candidate for the 2028 Games, leaving Paris to be confirmed as hosts for the 2024 Games. Both decisions were ratified at the 131st IOC Session on September 13, 2017.

Venues

Marketing
The emblems for the 2028 Summer Olympics and Paralympics were unveiled on September 1, 2020, featuring an interchangeable "A" reflecting the cultural diversity of Los Angeles.

References

External links
 LA 2028 Official Homepage

 
Summer Paralympic Games
Summer Paralympics
Summer Paralympics
International sports competitions hosted by the United States
Summer Paralympics 2028
2020s in Los Angeles
Multi-sport events in the United States
September 2028 sports events